Sydney 'Syd' Wentworth Nicholls (20 December 18963 June 1977) was an Australian cartoonist and commercial artist, best known for the long-running comic strip Fatty Finn.

Biography
Syd Nicholls was born in Frederick Henry Bay, Tasmania on 20 December 1896, the son of a watchmaker Hubert George Jordan and his wife Arabella Cluidunning, née Bartsche. He adopted his stepfather's surname when his mother remarried in 1907. The family moved to New Zealand and Nicholls attended a wide variety of schools in New Zealand and New South Wales before taking his first job with the printing firm of W.E. Smith in 1910. He studied for seven years under Norman Carter and Antonio Dattilo Rubbo at the Royal Art Society of New South Wales.

His first published work appeared in the International Socialist in 1912, at the age of sixteen and by the time he was eighteen he was having cartoons accepted by The Bulletin, Australian Worker and Australasian Seaman's Journal. Politically committed, Nicholls contributed cartoons to Direct Action, the publication of the Industrial Workers of the World. In 1914 one of these cartoons was instrumental in the paper's editor, Tom Barker, being sentenced to 12 months in jail for 'publishing material prejudicial to recruitment'. Nicholls's art titles for Raymond Longford's film, The Sentimental Bloke in 1919, brought him work for other films. In 1920 he visited the US to study art-title designs for motion pictures. On his return to Sydney, he joined the staff of the Sydney Evening News in 1923 as senior artist. Sir Errol Knox, the editor, asked him to create a comic in colour for the Sunday News supplement to compete with Us Fellers drawn by Jimmy Bancks for the rival Sydney Sunday Sun.

Nicholls produced Fat and His Friends, first published on 16 September 1923. 'Initially presented as a Billy Bunterish comedy figure, complete with straw boater, Fatty Finn evolved . . . into a knockabout schoolboy innocently living out his days in a never-never urban world'. On August 1924 the title of the strip was changed to Fatty Finn, heralding a change in the strip's direction and the role of the main character. Fatty Finn came to be recognised as one of the best-drawn comics in Australia and vied with Ginger Meggs in popularity.

In 1927 a film called The Kid Stakes was produced by Tal Ordell, featuring Fatty Finn and his goat, Hector. The film also contained a segment showing Nicolls at his drawing board, creating his famous characters. Three coloured Fatty Finn Annuals were published during 1928–30. The strip survived the absorptions of the Sunday News into the Sunday Guardian (1930) and of the latter by the Sunday Sun (1931). Nicholls had twice tried, in 1928 and 1929, to introduce a dream sequence into Fatty Finn, involving pirates, cannibals and highwaymen, but was forced by Knox to return to his original comic style. Believing that there was public interest, Nicholls drew one of the world's first adventure strips, Middy Malone, but could find no publisher. In 1931 he went to New York, seeking an outlet for Middy Malone. He recalled in an interview in 1973 that, 'Trying to place my new adventure series I found that any time I tried to compete with the local boys . . . it was a closed shop'.

Back in Sydney, Nicholls again unavailingly offered Middy Malone to a number of newspapers. Sacked without explanation in May 1933, he decided to publish his own comic books. Middy Malone in the Lost World appeared in the late 1930s; other Middy Malone adventures and the Fatty Finn Weekly, tabloid-sized, sold well. Comic books by other artists quickly followed. Unable to compete with increasing paper costs and cheap, imported American comics, Nicholls's publishing company was put out of business in 1950. Nicholls and Fatty Finn returned to newspapers, in the Sunday Herald in December 1951. Following the merger (1953) of the Sunday Herald and Sunday Sun and Guardian, they continued in the new Sun-Herald. The rivalry with Ginger Meggs was rekindled.

At the district registrar's office, Paddington, on 29 August 1942 Nicholls had married Roberta Clarice Vickery, a 25-year-old commercial artist. After being involved in having the Sydney Press Club stripped of its licence, Nicholls was a founder (1939), president (1942–44) and vice-president (1947–49 and 1957–59) of the Journalists' Club. He also chaired the New South Wales authors' and artists' section of the Australian Journalists' Association. From the late 1940s his artwork aided the New South Wales Teachers' Federation in many of its campaigns.

A portrait of Nicholls was painted by fellow Journalists' Club member William Pidgeon who painted the portraits of practically every club president up to 1976.

Death
While in a state of mental depression, Syd Nicholls fell to his death from the balcony next door to his tenth-floor Potts Point apartment on 3 June 1977.

Bibliography

References

External links
 
 ACE biographical portraits: the artists behind the comic book characters: the Australian comic book exhibition, Australian comics 1930s–1990s, touring Australia during 1995/96 / edited by Annette Shiell and Ingrid Unger (1994)
 

Australian comic strip cartoonists
Australian comics artists
Australian cartoonists
Australian commercial artists
1896 births
1977 deaths
Suicides by jumping in Australia
Suicides in New South Wales
People from Devonport, Tasmania
1977 suicides